USS Ebert may refer to the following ships of the United States Navy:

The name Ebert was assigned to DE-74 which was transferred under lend lease to the United Kingdom 13 October 1943 before commissioning.
, was a  commissioned 12 July 1944, escorted convoys in the Atlantic and Pacific during World War II and was transferred to Greece on 1 March 1951.

United States Navy ship names